Guirra (also known as Levant Red, Sudat) is a breed of domesticated sheep found in Spain.  Most recently, the Guirra has been bred mostly for meat.

Characteristics
Lambs have a reddish-brown fleece.  Their wool lightens as they mature to a red and cream color mixed fleece.

The ears, medium in size, project horizontally from the top of the head.  The fleece covers the trunk, neck, and part of legs.  The Guirra does not grow a dense wool and is considered to be quite greasy.

References

Sheep breeds originating in Spain
Sheep breeds